Serdar Demirel (born 4 September 1983, in Sivas) is a Turkish sport shooter specialized in 10 meter air pistol events. He is the police chief of the public security branch office at Nevşehir provincial directorate of security.

Achievements
 2002 ISSF World Shooting Championships in Lahti, Finland (unior men's),

 2021 European Shooting Championships, Osijek, Croatia (Team),

Records
50 metre pistol
Qualification: 553
With final: 653.4
10 metre air pistol
Qualification: 575
With final: 675.5

References 

1983 births
Living people
Sportspeople from Sivas
Turkish police chiefs
Turkish male sport shooters
ISSF pistol shooters
21st-century Turkish people